Cornwall Church (formerly Cornwall Park Church of God) is an Evangelical Christian megachurch in Bellingham, Washington affiliated with the Church of God Movement, with an average weekly attendance exceeding 2,500.

History
The church that would become Cornwall began around 1900 (shortly after the foundation of the Church of God Movement in 1881) as a home-based church in Bellingham established by Simon Decker, a pioneer and early follower of the movement. In 1920 the church obtained a location on Broadway Street in Bellingham. The church survived the Great Depression solely on donations from rich members, as all tithes (then an average of $3.00) went directly to the pastor's salary. By 1934 the church had a congregation of 40.

In 1946, Charles Ford became pastor. Under his mantra, "It is better to have a hundred people working than to do the work of a hundred," the church's attendance reached 100. Ford obtained four city lots on Meridian Street (adjacent to Cornwall City Park, named after Californian pioneer Pierre Barlow Cornwall) with the hope of one day building an official sanctuary. Ford served till 1967, taking a ten-year sabbatical from 1950 to 1960.

In 1967, Ford was succeeded by Charles Milliman. Under Milliman's pastorship, the first official church building was constructed on Meridian, and the congregation was given the name "Cornwall Park Church of God". However, attendance did not grow until 1985, when 29-year-old Ken Long succeeded to the pastorship of Cornwall. Under his direction, Cornwall appealed to the collegiate community of Bellingham (from Western Washington University) and began several outreach programs. With attendance averaging at 350, services were moved to the adjacent Boys & Girls Club. When Long left for First Church of God in Vero Beach, Florida in late 1992, his youth pastor Bob Marvel became interim pastor. Soon thereafter, in 1993, Marvel was chosen as senior pastor.

After Marvel's accession, Cornwall experienced rapid growth. In February 2002 Cornwall moved to its current location on Northwest Drive in Bellingham to accommodate its expanding congregation, at which point "Park" and "Church of God" were dropped from its name.

Salt on the Street
"Salt on the Street" is a weekly evangelistic outreach program founded by Cornwall Church in 2000 that provides food and clothing for the homeless and poor of Whatcom County, Washington. Based on the concept of the "salt of the earth," the program holds weekly outdoor church services and provides aid in overcoming drug and alcohol addictions.

Youth Programs
Cornwall Church also serves three age groups of kids.  Explorers League offers age appropriate learning environments from birth through 5th grade during each weekend service. 6th though 8th grade students have a special gathering called the Edge. It is held on Tuesday nights (6:30-8pm).  High school freshmen through seniors have their youth group, Encounter, on Wednesday nights (also 6:30-8pm)

See also
 History of Bellingham, Washington
 Megachurch

References

1900s establishments in Washington (state)
Religious organizations established in the 1900s
Evangelical churches in Washington (state)
Evangelical megachurches in the United States
Buildings and structures in Bellingham, Washington
20th-century Protestant churches
Church of God (Anderson, Indiana)
Megachurches in Indiana